The knockout stage of the 2022 FIFA World Cup was the second and final stage of the competition, following the group stage. Played from 3 to 18 December, the knockout stage ended with the final, held at Lusail Stadium in Lusail. The top two teams from each group advanced to the knockout stage to compete in a single-elimination tournament. There were 16 matches in the knockout stage, including a third-place play-off played between the two losing teams of the semi-finals.

Format
The knockout stage of the 2022 FIFA World Cup was contested between 16 teams that qualified from the group stage. Matches in the knockout stage were played to a finish. If the score of a match was level at the end of 90 minutes of playing time, extra time was played. If, after two periods of 15 minutes, the scores were still tied, the match was decided by a penalty shoot-out. All times listed are local in Arabia Standard Time (UTC+3).

Qualified teams
The top two placed teams from each of the eight groups qualified for the knockout stage.

Bracket
The tournament bracket is shown below, with bold denoting the winners of each match.

Round of 16

Netherlands vs United States
The Netherlands had met the United States five times, with the former winning the first four meetings. They most recently met in June 2015, with the United States winning 4–3.

In the 10th minute, the Netherlands went in front when Memphis Depay finished to the left corner of the net after a pass from the right by Denzel Dumfries after a sequence of passes. In added time in the first half, Daley Blind scored to make it 2–0 with another low finish after a pass from the right from Dumfries. In the 76th minute, the United States pulled a goal back when Haji Wright finished with a deflection from Christian Pulisic's looped cross at the far post. Dumfries sealed the win with a third goal for the Netherlands in the 81st minute when he finished with a side-footed volley at the far post from Blind's cross from the left.

Argentina vs Australia
Argentina had met Australia seven times, winning five, drawing one, and losing one. They met in the 1994 FIFA World Cup inter-confederation play-off, which Argentina won 2–1 on aggregate. The teams also met in Argentina's 4–2 win in the 2005 FIFA Confederations Cup. They most recently met in September 2007, with Argentina winning 1–0.

On his 1,000th career appearance, Lionel Messi scored his 789th career goal, giving Argentina the lead in the 35th minute with a low left foot finish to the left corner. Julián Álvarez made it 2–0 in the 57th minute when he pounced on an error by Australian goalkeeper Mathew Ryan to finish low to the net past the stranded goalkeeper. Australia pulled a goal back in the 77th minute when Craig Goodwin's strike took a huge deflection off Enzo Fernández before finishing in the right corner of the net. Australia had chances to level the match, first when Aziz Behich dribbled past four players before his shot was blocked by Lisandro Martínez, then in added time when Garang Kuol had a shot saved at close range by Argentine goalkeeper Emiliano Martínez.

France vs Poland
Prior to this match, France had met Poland 16 times, winning eight, drawing five, and losing three. The three defeats included the 1982 World Cup third-place play-off which Poland won 3–2. They most recently met in a friendly won by France 1–0 in June 2011.

In the 44th minute, Olivier Giroud received a pass from Kylian Mbappé before firing low to the right corner of the net to put France into the lead and also break the French goal-scoring record with his 52nd goal. Mbappé made it 2–0 in the 74th minute when he received the ball on the left just inside the penalty area before firing powerfully with his right foot to the top left corner of the net. Mbappé got his second of the game in the first minute of the added time with a right foot curling finish to the right corner of the net. In the final minute Robert Lewandowski pulled a goal back to make it 3–1 with a penalty low to the left corner, awarded after a handball by Dayot Upamecano.

England vs Senegal
This was the first ever meeting between the sides. It was also the first time England faced an African opposition in the World Cup knockout stage since the 1990 quarter-final win over Cameroon.

England went front in the 38th minute when Jordan Henderson scored low to the net from 12 yards out after a pass from Jude Bellingham on the left. In the added time in the first half, reigning World Cup Golden Boot winner Harry Kane made it 2–0 with his first goal in the tournament, firing into the net from the right after a pass from Phil Foden. In the 57th minute Foden crossed from the left for Bukayo Saka to make it 3–0 with a clipped left-foot finish over Senegal goalkeeper Édouard Mendy.

Japan vs Croatia
Japan had met Croatia three times, winning one, drawing one, and losing one. From the three, two happened in the World Cup group stages: Croatia won 1–0 in 1998 and drew 0–0 in 2006. The latter was their most recent encounter.

In the 43rd minute Daizen Maeda scored for Japan with a low finish in the penalty area after the ball was knocked back from the left. Ten minutes into the second half Ivan Perišić equalised when he headed powerfully to the right corner of the net after a cross from Dejan Lovren on the right. The match went to extra time with no further goals scored and so went to the penalty shoot-out. Japan missed three of their four penalties – all saved by goalkeeper Dominik Livaković – with Mario Pašalić scored the winning penalty with a low shot to the left as Croatia won 3–1 in the shoot-out. Livaković became the third goalkeeper to make three saves in a World Cup shoot-out, after Ricardo in 2006 and his fellow countryman Danijel Subašić in 2018.

Brazil vs South Korea
Brazil had met South Korea seven times, winning six and losing one. They most recently met in June 2022, which Brazil won 5–1.

Vinícius Júnior opened the scoring for Brazil in the 7th minute when he scored with a side footed shot to the right of the net past three Korean defenders on the line. Brazil were awarded a penalty six minutes later when Richarlison was fouled just inside the penalty area, Neymar scored the penalty with a low shot to the right corner with the goalkeeper not moving. Richarlison made it 3–0 in the 29th minute when he controlled the ball with his head before receiving the ball back from Thiago Silva and passing into the left corner of the net. Lucas Paquetá got a fourth goal in the 36th minute when he volleyed low into the left corner of the net with his right foot after a cross from Vinícius Júnior on the left. South Korea pulled a goal back in the second half when Paik Seung-ho finished to the right of the net from 30 yards out. With ten minutes left and leading by three goals, goalkeeper Alisson was substituted for third-choice Weverton, making Brazil the first team to ever use 26 different players in one World Cup and giving all 26 players play time in the tournament.

The match was the last held at the Stadium 974 before its demolition.

Morocco vs Spain
Morocco had met Spain in three full international matches, drawing one and losing two. Spain won both the 1962 World Cup inter-continental play-off legs, while the most recent meeting ended in a 2–2 draw in the 2018 World Cup group stage.

After a goalless 120 minutes, the match went into penalty shoot-out, which Morocco won to reach the quarter-finals for the first time ever. Achraf Hakimi scored the winning penalty with a Panenka kick in the middle of the goal. They became the first Arab country to have reached this phase, and just the fourth African country – after Cameroon in 1990, Senegal in 2002, and Ghana in 2010 – to have qualified for the last eight. Their manager Walid Regragui became the first African and first Arab to reach thus far.

Portugal vs Switzerland
Portugal had met Switzerland 25 times, winning 9, drawing 5, and losing 11. They met in several World Cup qualifications, in 1938, 1970, 1990, 1994, and 2018. Both teams most recently met in June 2022, with Switzerland winning 1–0 in the 2022–23 UEFA Nations League A.

Cristiano Ronaldo was left out of the starting line-up for Portugal – a first in major tournaments since the UEFA Euro 2008 group stage defeat against Switzerland – with Gonçalo Ramos named instead to make his first start. This time, the Portuguese got their revenge as Ramos became the first hat-trick scorer of this World Cup, the first player to score hat-trick in his first World Cup start since Miroslav Klose in 2002, and the youngest World Cup hat-trick scorer since Flórián Albert in 1962 on course of beating the Swiss 6–1 to reach the quarter-finals, a first since 2006. In addition, he also assisted for Portugal's fourth goal scored by Raphaël Guerreiro. By scoring the second goal, Pepe became the oldest player to have scored at a World Cup knockout stage and the second-oldest to have scored at a World Cup, putting him only behind Roger Milla, who scored the consolation goal in Cameroon's thumping by the opposite scoreline in the 1994 group stage by Russia. Manuel Akanji scored the consolation goal before Portuguese substitute Rafael Leão replied.

Quarter-finals

Croatia vs Brazil
Croatia had met Brazil four times, losing three and drawing one. Two of these took place in World Cup group stages with Brazil winning both times: 1–0 in 2006 and 3–1 in 2014.

Neymar opened the scoring just before the half time of extra time when he received the ball back from Lucas Paquetá before rounding the goalkeeper and shooting high to the net from the right. A defensive lapse cost Brazil their lead as Bruno Petković equalised three minutes from the end with a left foot shot to the left corner deflection by the leg of a Brazilian; it was Croatia's only shot on target of the game. In the shoot-out, Croatia scored all four of their penalties, while Brazil's first kicker Rodrygo had his saved by Dominik Livaković diving to his left and Marquinhos hitting his penalty low against the left post sealing their elimination. Croatia qualified for their second successive World Cup semi-finals and the third time ever, while Brazil exited the tournament at the hands of European teams for the fifth consecutive time, all happened after their 2002 World Cup final triumph against Germany, which remains their last knockout stage win against European opposition. In the same period, Brazil was eliminated in all four quarter-finals they played away from home, thus excluding the fourth place finish at the 2014 tournament which they hosted.

Netherlands vs Argentina
This was the 10th meeting between the Netherlands and Argentina, continuing a historic rivalry between the two nations. The Netherlands had won four of the previous nine meetings, Argentina had won one, and the remaining four matches were draws. They had met five previous times in World Cup matches: a 4–0 win for the Dutch at the second group stage in 1974 was replied with a 3–1 win for the Argentines in the 1978 final. The Dutch won 2–1 in the 1998 quarter-finals prior to two goalless draws in the 2006 group stage and in their most recent encounter in the 2014 semi-finals, only for the Argentines to win 4–2 on penalties this time.

Nahuel Molina scored for Argentina after 35 minutes after he received a pass from Lionel Messi, flicking the ball low past the advancing goalkeeper. Messi made it 2–0 in the 73rd minute with a penalty, kicking to the right of the net after Marcos Acuña had been fouled in the penalty area. Netherlands substitute Wout Weghorst pulled a goal back in the 83rd minute with a downward header to the left after a cross from the right. He then got a second in the eleventh minute of added time when a free-kick on the edge of the box was played in low for him to get his shot in which went into the right of the net forcing the match to enter extra time, and ultimately ended in a penalty shoot-out. Just like in the 2014 encounter, two Dutch players missed from the spot, and four Argentines scored.

The match had a total of 18 yellow cards, breaking the record of 16 that was set in another Dutch knockout defeat in the 2006 round of 16 against Portugal. The decisions by the referee Antonio Mateu Lahoz received criticism, as fans and media considered a yellow card to be too lenient for some incidents, while a potential handball by Messi was overlooked. The amount of yellow cards issued by Mateu Lahoz was also criticised.

Because of this, the match was frequently referred to as the Battle of Lusail.

The match was also marred by the death of American sportswriter Grant Wahl after he collapsed near the end of the match while watching in the press box.

Morocco vs Portugal
Morocco had met Portugal twice, having won and lost once each. Both took place in World Cup group stages with Morocco winning 3–1 in 1986 and Portugal prevailing 1–0 in 2018.

Youssef En-Nesyri put Morocco in the lead in the 42nd minute when he jumped high to head past the advancing goalkeeper and into the empty net, prompting Portugal to sub on Cristiano Ronaldo, thus equalling the record for most international caps set by Bader Al-Mutawa. However, Morocco clung on, becoming the first African and first Arab country to reach the World Cup semi-finals, as well as the second Muslim-majority country to qualify for the last four; the other was Turkey in 2002.

England vs France
England had met France 31 times, winning 17, drawing 5 and losing 9. Two of these took place during the World Cup with England winning both times: 2–0 in the 1966 group stage and 3–1 during the 1982 first group stage. They most recently met in a friendly in June 2017, with France winning 3–2.

In the 17th minute Aurélien Tchouaméni opened the scoring with a shot from outside the penalty area to the left corner in the first half which beat England goalkeeper Jordan Pickford diving down to his right. Some pundits questioned the goal because England player Bukayo Saka had been brought to the ground allowing France to win possession in the build-up to the goal. Some thought it was a clear foul, while others, including British journalists, thought the contact was not clear enough for VAR to overturn the on-pitch decision. Early in the second half, Tchouaméni fouled Saka in the penalty box. Harry Kane scored the penalty against his club team-mate Hugo Lloris shooting to the left, bringing Kane level with Wayne Rooney as England's all-time top scorer at 53 goals. Olivier Giroud, who entered the match as France's all-time top scorer, also scored his 53rd international goal twelve minutes from time with a header to the left of the net after a cross from Antoine Griezmann on the left. In the 84th minute, England were awarded a second penalty when substitute Mason Mount was pushed over in the penalty area by Théo Hernandez. Kane again took a penalty but shot over the bar with France going on to win 2–1. France became the first reigning world champions to reach the World Cup semi-finals since Brazil in 1998, whom France would beat in that final. France's cruise to the semi-finals, along with Croatia's – whom they defeated in the 2018 final, marked the first time that both teams from a World Cup final reached the last four of the subsequent tournament since Argentina and West Germany in 1990.

Semi-finals

Argentina vs Croatia
Argentina and Croatia had met five times, each winning twice, and drawing once. Two of these matches took place in the World Cup group stages, a 1–0 win for Argentina in 1998 was followed by Croatia's 3–0 win in 2018.

Both teams approached each other carefully in the first 30 minutes, until Dejan Lovren and Joško Gvardiol mistakenly let Julián Álvarez pass through the defense, causing Dominik Livaković to collide with Álvarez in the 34th minute. Match referee Daniele Orsato booked Livaković and awarded a penalty kick to Argentina, which Lionel Messi converted high to the right side of the goal. The collision also sparked a feud between Orsato and some Croatia players, causing Orsato to book Mateo Kovačić and send off assistant coach Mario Mandžukić. In the 39th minute, Álvarez passed through the defence and scored Argentina's second goal. In the second half of the match, Croatian coach Zlatko Dalić substituted off five players, including team captain Luka Modrić, in order to boost the attacking ability of the team, but this didn't stop Messi and Álvarez from providing another goal for the Argentinians. In the 69th minute, Messi dribbled through Gvardiol and passed the ball to Álvarez from the right, enabling Álvarez to score a second goal. The match ended with the scoreline of 3–0 to Argentina. Messi's penalty goal took him ahead of fellow countryman Gabriel Batistuta as Argentina's most prolific goal-scorer at the World Cup, with 11 goals scored, and this match put him level with former German player Lothar Matthäus's record for the most matches played, with the final set to be his record-breaking 26th match.

France vs Morocco
France had met Morocco seven times, winning five and drawing two. They most recently met in a friendly in 2007, with the match ending in a 2–2 draw. This was their first World Cup meeting. This match marked the first ever World Cup semi-final featuring an African team, and also the first involving an Arab country. This was the third time that a team from a confederation other than Europe and South America has made it to the World Cup semi-finals, after the United States in 1930 and South Korea in 2002.

In the fifth minute Théo Hernandez scored with an acrobatic volley from a very tight angle on the left after Kylian Mbappé's shot was diverted into his path, giving France the early lead. Hernandez's goal, timed at four minutes and 39 seconds, was the fastest in a World Cup semi-final since Vavá netted in the second minute of Brazil's 5–2 win against France in 1958. Despite being in possession of the ball for most of the game, Morocco were not rewarded for this pressure and in the 79th minute, with his first touch of the game having come on as a substitute 44 seconds before, Randal Kolo Muani doubled the advantage with a close-range shot, after Mbappé had dribbled into the penalty area. France won 2–0 and set up a final against Argentina, also continuing to make progress toward becoming the first nation to successfully defend the World Cup in 60 years after Brazil's victories in 1958 and 1962.

Third place play-off
The two teams had previously faced each other twice, including their opening game in Group F at this World Cup, which ended 0–0. This marked the second consecutive World Cup where the teams playing in the third place match also played each other in the group stage, following Belgium vs England in 2018.

The match started with an early goal, after Joško Gvardiol scored a diving header to the top left corner in the seventh minute following a headed pass from Ivan Perišić. Croatia's joy lasted only two minutes; in the ninth minute Achraf Dari received a deflection from a free kick and levelled the score with a close-range header, having been left unmarked in front of the net. However, the  managed to regain the lead in the 42nd minute through Mislav Oršić, who bent a brilliant strike from just inside the penalty area on the left, hitting the inside of the right post before the ball nestled in the back of the net. The second half held no goals, giving Croatia their second-ever third place finish, following the one achieved in 1998. This was the 11th consecutive World Cup in which European teams finished third, stretching back to 1982.

Final

Argentina vs France 

The two sides had met twelve times, with Argentina having won six of them, France three, and the other three matches ending in draws. They had met three times in the World Cup, with two of these in group stages: Argentina winning 1–0 in 1930 (their World Cup debut) and 2–1 in 1978. Their most recent World Cup meeting resulted in France defeating Argentina 4–3 in the 2018 FIFA World Cup round of 16, France's first win over Argentina since 1986.

Both teams were seeking to win their third World Cup title. France were the first title holders to play in the final since Brazil, whom they defeated in 1998, and were seeking to become the first nation to retain the World Cup in 60 years, after Brazil's victories in 1958 and 1962. Their coach Didier Deschamps was attempting to become the first manager to win multiple World Cup titles since Vittorio Pozzo in 1934 and 1938 with Italy. Argentina were seeking to win the title for the first time in 36 years, having won in 1978 and 1986.

Leading 2–0 at half time from Lionel Messi and Ángel Di María, Argentina conceded two goals in two minutes from Kylian Mbappé. In the extra time, Messi scored again only for Mbappé to equalise from a penalty, making him the first player since Geoff Hurst in 1966 to score a hat-trick in a World Cup final. Having scored one in 2018, he became the first player to score four goals in multiple World Cup finals as well as the first player to score eight goals in one World Cup since Ronaldo in 2002 en route to the title; however, Mbappé failed to emulate Hurst's and Ronaldo's successes: despite him scoring the first penalty for France, they lost 4–2 in the penalty shoot-out. Argentina achieved their third world title, surpassing France and Uruguay. They also became the first non-European side to win the title since Brazil in 2002, when the World Cup was also held in Asia. France's loss was their second in a World Cup final, having been defeated by Italy in 2006 in a match which was also decided by penalties. Some reporters regarded the match as one of the best FIFA World Cup finals of all time.

Notes

References

External links
 

2022 FIFA World Cup
2022
Argentina at the 2022 FIFA World Cup
Australia at the 2022 FIFA World Cup
Brazil at the 2022 FIFA World Cup
Croatia at the 2022 FIFA World Cup
England at the 2022 FIFA World Cup
France at the 2022 FIFA World Cup
Japan at the 2022 FIFA World Cup
Morocco at the 2022 FIFA World Cup
Netherlands at the 2022 FIFA World Cup
Poland at the 2022 FIFA World Cup
Portugal at the 2022 FIFA World Cup
Senegal at the 2022 FIFA World Cup
South Korea at the 2022 FIFA World Cup
Spain at the 2022 FIFA World Cup
Switzerland at the 2022 FIFA World Cup
United States at the 2022 FIFA World Cup